Wachenheim is a Verbandsgemeinde ("collective municipality") in the district of Bad Dürkheim, Rhineland-Palatinate, Germany. The seat of the Verbandsgemeinde is in Wachenheim.

The Verbandsgemeinde Wachenheim consists of the following Ortsgemeinden ("local municipalities"):

Ellerstadt
Friedelsheim
Gönnheim
Wachenheim

Verbandsgemeinde in Rhineland-Palatinate